Sparna platyptera is a species of longhorn beetle (family Cerambycidae). It was described by Henry Walter Bates in 1881. It is known from Brazil.

References

Colobotheini
Beetles described in 1881